Elena Golovina (born 16 February 1961) is a retired Soviet, later Russian biathlete.

She has participated at the 1992 Winter Olympics. Golovina won the Overall World Cup in 1988–89 World Cup season. Golovina claimed 12 medals at Biathlon World Championships: ten gold, one silver and one bronze. She is second most successful woman of all time at Biathlon World Championships.

References

External links 
 

1961 births
Living people
Biathletes at the 1992 Winter Olympics
Soviet female biathletes
Russian female biathletes
Olympic biathletes of the Unified Team
Biathlon World Championships medalists